Stenaroa is a genus of moths in the subfamily Lymantriinae. The genus was erected by George Hampson in 1910.

Species
Some species of this genus are:
Stenaroa crocea Griveaud, 1977
Stenaroa flavescens Griveaud, 1977
Stenaroa ignepicta Hampson, 1910
Stenaroa miniata (Kenrick, 1914) = Perinetia leucocloea Collenette, 1936 
Stenaroa rubriflava Griveaud, 1973

References

Lymantriinae